JFC International is a major wholesaler and distributor of Asian food products in the United States. In addition to its own products, JFC International also imports branded products from other international companies. The company's official establishment was in 1958 and later named JFC International in 1978, however the company existed in various forms beginning in 1906. It is owned by the Japanese company Kikkoman.

Operations
JFC's brands include Nishiki, Dynasty, JFC, Wel-Pac, Hime and Hapi. Under its brands the company sells Botan Rice candy, Nishiki rice and other Japanese food items.

References

External links
 JFC Japan website
 JFC International's USA website
 JFC Canada website
 JFC Europe website

Food and drink companies of the United States
Food and drink companies established in 1958
Wholesalers of Japan
1958 establishments in California